Brackmann is a surname. Notable people with the surname include:

 Albert Brackmann (1871–1952), German historian 
 Norbert Brackmann (born 1954), German politician
  (1841–1927), Russian politician

See also
 Brackman